The Salon Carré is an iconic room of the Louvre Palace, created in its current dimensions during a reconstruction of that part of the palace following a fire in February 1661. It gave its name to the longstanding tradition of  exhibitions of contemporary art in Paris which had its heyday there between 1725 and 1848. Since 1849, it has been permanently used by the Louvre Museum, which currently uses it to display Italian Renaissance painting.

History

When the Grande Galerie was built in the late 16th and early 17th centuries, a separate room was created at its eastern end above the lavishly decorated  on the ground floor. This room was destroyed together with the nearby  by the fire of 6 February 1661. Louis Le Vau rebuilt it on an expanded footprint, including further space to the north that gave it more width and its current name, even though its plan is rectangular and not square. 

In the 1780s, its design was debated in the context of early plans to create a permanent museum in the room, leading to the creation in 1789 of a skylight in its roofing, designed by Charles-Axel Guillaumot and one of the first such examples for art exhibition purposes.

On 2 April 1810, Napoleon and Marie Louise of Austria led a procession from the Tuileries throughout the Grande Galerie on the occasion of their wedding, which was celebrated in the Salon Carré, temporarily converted into a chapel.

In 1848, the Louvre's new director Philippe-Auguste Jeanron successfully advocated the relocation of the  outside of the Louvre, so that the Salon Carré would be devoted to permanent museum use. The room was subsequently redecorated by architect Félix Duban, with sculptor Pierre-Charles Simart creating a richly decorated ceiling of gilded stucco celebrating past French artists, still in place. The refurbished room was inaugurated on 5 June 1851, together with the renovated Grande Galerie, Galerie d’Apollon, and Salle des Sept-Cheminées.

In 1972, the Salon Carré's museography was remade with lighting from a hung tubular case, designed by Louvre architect  with assistance from designers , Joseph-André Motte and Pierre Paulin.

Gallery

See also
 Petite Galerie of the Louvre
 Galerie d'Apollon
 Grande Galerie
 Escalier Daru

Notes

Louvre Palace
Ancien Régime French architecture